MiTAP, or Mitre Text and Audio Processing, is a computer system that tries to automatically gather, translate, organize, and present information "for monitoring infectious disease outbreaks and other global events." It is also used in the FBI Investigative Data Warehouse.

Sources

"Multiple information sources in multiple languages are automatically captured, filtered, translated, summarized, and categorized"

It uses 'web sources, electronic mailing lists, newsgroups, news feeds, and audio-video data.'. The audio-video is automatically transcribed into text by the ViTAP system.

Guts

In 2002 it was reported to have used CyberTrans, the Alembic natural language analyzer, WebSumm summarizer, Lucene indexing, NewsBlaster from Columbia, Brill tagging, SOAP, HTML, NNTP, Perl, Unix scripts, and other tools. Upgrades to various components are planned.

Creators

It was created at the Mitre Corporation by Damianos and a team of other researchers, with public release in 2001.

Users

It is being used by the FBI as part of their Investigative Data Warehouse via DARPA's TIDES program. According to 2004 FBI email, MiTAP was running at San Diego State University, collecting only English language website news. It mentioned a plan to have FBI run its own version of MiTAP.

It has also been used by people in the White House, the Department of Homeland Security, the Pentagon, the American Red Cross, the United Nations, and the European Disaster Center

Notes

Bibliography

 
  (Contains various emails from inside the FBI regarding the IDW)

Mitre Corporation